Geraldine "Jade" Buray Ecleo-Villaroman (born October 5, 1970) is a Filipina politician and part-time actress/singer.

Ecleo-Villaroman served as the first governor of the Philippine province of Dinagat Islands when it was established in 2006. She served as governor from July 1, 2007 until 2010 and was succeeded by her mother, Glenda B. Ecleo. Villaroman served as Vice-Governor to her mother from July 1, 2010 until 2013 and was defeated in the 2013 elections for the governor post by her mother, who was re-elected for a second term. In the 2016 general elections, she ran for a congressional seat to represent the lone district of Dinagat Islands but was defeated by the incumbent congresswoman, Kaka Bag-ao.

Villaroman is the daughter of Ruben Ecleo, founder of the Philippine Benevolent Missionaries Association, and the sister of Gwendolyn Ecleo and controversial religious politician Ruben Ecleo, Jr. She is married to a non-politician and non-celebrity Mr. Villaroman.

References

Living people
1970 births
Governors of the Dinagat Islands
People from Dinagat Islands
Women provincial governors of the Philippines
Geraldine